PBC Flamurtari Vlorë is an Albanian basketball team that plays in the Albanian A1 Basketball League. The club was founded in 1924 as part of the multi disciplinary KS Flamurtari.

Current roster

Domestic achievements
Basketball First Division

External links
 Eurobasket.com PBC Flamurtari Page

Flamurtari
Flamurtari
Sport in Vlorë
Basketball teams established in 1924